The Federation of Old Cornwall Societies (FOCS) was formed in 1924, on the initiative of Robert Morton Nance, with the objective of collecting and maintaining "all those ancient things that make the spirit of Cornwall — its traditions, its old words and ways, and what remains to it of its Celtic language and nationality". The motto of the federation—as written on their web site—is "", which translated into English is "Gather ye the fragments that are left, that nothing be lost". The motto in the OCS logo is the Cornish phrase King Arthur is not dead. The first Old Cornwall Society was established by Robert Morton Nance in St Ives in 1920.

Summer events 
The OCS celebrate the old Cornish tradition of midsummer bonfires, normally held on 23 June each year. The hilltop bonfires that form a chain are currently held at Kit Hill, St Breock Beacon, Castle An Dinas, and Redruth.

In the autumn the harvest festival known as Crying The Neck is also celebrated by the OCS.

Periodical 
Old Cornwall, the journal of the Federation, began publication in 1925 and is published twice yearly. The first editor was Robert Morton Nance.

See also 

 Gorseth Kernow
 List of topics related to Cornwall

References

External links 
 Main site of FOCS 
 South Australia's Kernewek Lowender (Cornish Festival)
 Cornish Association of Victoria, Australia
 Cornish Association of Bendigo, Victoria, Australia
 London Cornish Association
 The New Zealand Cornish Association 
 Strange days: Fired by ancient zeal in Cornwall, The Daily Telegraph article on Midsummer bonfires

1924 establishments in England
Arts in Cornwall
Charities based in Cornwall
Clubs and societies in Cornwall
Cornish culture
Cornish nationalism
Heritage organisations in the United Kingdom
Organizations established in 1924